Von Arx is a surname. Notable people with the surname include:

Cäsar von Arx (1895–1949), Swiss dramatist
Casimir von Arx (1852–1931), Swiss politician
Jan von Arx (born 1978), Swiss ice hockey player
Jeffrey P. von Arx (born 1944), American academic
Kurt von Arx (born 1937), Swiss field hockey player
Reto Von Arx (born 1976), Swiss ice hockey player